Kev Reynolds (7 December 1943 – 10 December 2021) was an English outdoor writer, known for his guidebooks for climbing and walking in the Pyrenees, the Alps, the Himalayas and southern England.

Personal life
Reynolds was born on 7 December 1943 at Ingatestone in Essex. He worked in local government until 1967, when he married Min and they moved to St. Moritz, where they worked in a hostel. They returned to England and became wardens of Crockham Hill YHA youth hostel. They later lived in Edenbridge in Kent. 

His first trip abroad was to the Atlas Mountains of Morocco in 1965, travelling by truck with a group of friends. He visited the Pyrenees and the Alps while writing guidebooks to those areas in the 1970s and 1980s, and in 1989 made the first of almost 20 trips to Nepal and the adjacent areas of India. He declared that Manaslu in the Himalayas was "the most beautiful walk in the world". 

Kev Reynolds died on 10 December 2021, aged 78, having suffered from tuberculosis, which restricted his life during the COVID-19 pandemic. He was survived by his wife Min, two children and two grandchildren.

Writing
Reynolds wrote more than 50 books on climbing and walking, on areas including the Pyrenees, the Alps, the Himalayas, Nepal, and southern England.

His first published book was Walks and Climbs in the Pyrenees in 1978: its seventh edition was published in 2019. His Trekking the Tour of Mont Blanc appeared in its 5th edition in 2020. Cameron McNeish described his Walking in the Alps as "probably the most important guide to walking abroad that has been published in Britain. It is simply stunning...". As well as numerous mountain guides he wrote guides to the North Downs Way, South Downs Way and Cotswold Way. In 2013 he published A Walk in the Clouds, a collection of 75 autobiographical stories, and in 2019 he edited Fifty Years of Adventure, a celebration of 50 years of his main publisher the Cicerone Press.

Recognition
Reynolds was one of the first honorary members of the British Association of European Mountain Leaders, later the British Association of International Mountain Leaders and also an honorary member of the Outdoor Writers and Photographers Guild, which in 2014 recognised him with its Lifetime Achievement Award.

Selected publications
 
 First edition: 1978, 
 (Celebrating fifty years of the Cicerone Press)

 (75 autobiographical stories)

References

External link
 archived 11 December 2021

1943 births
2021 deaths
British travel writers
British mountain climbers
People from Chelmsford
People from Edenbridge, Kent